Frederick Samuel Fox (22 November 1898 – 15 May 1968) was an English football goalkeeper.

He played for several clubs, including Gillingham (where he played over 100 Football League matches) and Brentford during the 1920s and 1930s, and also gained one cap for England.

In 1925 he played for England against France. He was injured and had to withdraw from the game after France's second goal on 75 minutes, but England, finishing the match with nine men, hung on to win 3–2.

Later in life, Fox served as a director at hometown club Swindon Town.

References

1898 births
1968 deaths
Association football goalkeepers
English footballers
England international footballers
Abertillery Town F.C. players
Gillingham F.C. players
Preston North End F.C. players
Millwall F.C. players
Halifax Town A.F.C. players
Brentford F.C. players
Truro City F.C. players
English Football League players
Swindon Town F.C. wartime guest players
Swindon Town F.C. directors and chairmen
People from Highworth